Tilak Nagar is a residential colony in Chembur of Mumbai. There is also a railway station on the Harbour Line of the Mumbai suburban railway by this name. Named after freedom fighter Bal Gangadhar Tilak, this is a suburban area in Chembur West,Mumbai, India.

Educational institutions
 Lokmanya Tilak High School
 Amchi Shala

Notable people lived or living in Tilak Nagar
Anil Kapoor
Anant Jog
Vijay Patkar
Chhota Rajan
Bada Rajan
Lalchand Rajput
Macchindra Kambli
Vaibhav Mangle
Tony Jose
Jay Bhanushali

Ganpati celebrations
Because Tilak Nagar has a major Hindu population consisting of Maharashtrians many religious programmes are held there regularly, with additional audience from the nearby areas of Chembur and from other parts of the city.  Tilak Nagar is famous for Ganpati decorations of its pandals. It also has a substantial Christian population with the Infant Jesus Chapel near the station.

Transportation

Autorickshaws, BEST buses and trains are the public modes of transport available in Tilak Nagar. The colony is serviced by the Harbour line of the Central Railway via the Tilak Nagar railway station. The stations of Vidyavihar and Chembur are also in close proximity. The access to Lokmanya Tilak Terminus (Kurla Terminus) is also via Tilak Nagar station. Chembur monorail station and Ghatkopar metro station are also easily accessible.

References

Suburbs of Mumbai
Memorials to Bal Gangadhar Tilak